Valter Erik Nyström (30 December 1915 – 11 March 2011) was a Swedish long-distance runner. He competed at the 1952 Summer Olympics and finished sixth in the 10,000 metres event. Nyström held the Swedish titles  in the 10,000 m in 1947, 1949 and 1951 and in the 8,000 m cross-country event in 1947 and 1951. He was awarded the 148th Stora Grabbars Märke award in 1951, when he set national records over 10,000, 20,000, and 25,000 m, and the Svenska Dagbladet Gold Medal in 1952.

References

1915 births
2011 deaths
Swedish male long-distance runners
Athletes (track and field) at the 1952 Summer Olympics
Olympic athletes of Sweden
People from Sandviken Municipality
Sportspeople from Gävleborg County